Ilocos Sur's 3rd congressional district was one of the three congressional districts of the Philippines in the province of Ilocos Sur in existence between 1907 and 1919. It was created in 1907 from former territories of the province under Philippine Commission Act No. 1582 following the passage of the 1902 Philippine Organic Act. The district was originally composed of the municipalities of Bangued, Bucay, Dolores, La Paz, Pilar, San Quintin and Santa, most of which were located in Abra, a sub-province of Ilocos Sur since 1905. It was a single-member district throughout the three legislatures of the Philippine Assembly from 1907 to 1916 and the first legislature of the House of Representatives from 1916 to 1919.

The district was represented by a total of only three representatives throughout its brief existence. It was abolished in 1919 following the passage of Legislative Act No. 2683 which created the province of Abra in 1917. It was last represented by Eustaquio Purugganan of the Nacionalista Party (NP) who was also elected as the first representative of Abra's at-large congressional district following its dissolution.

Representation history

See also
Legislative districts of Ilocos Sur

References

Former congressional districts of the Philippines
Politics of Ilocos Sur
History of Abra (province)
1907 establishments in the Philippines
1919 disestablishments in the Philippines
Congressional districts of the Ilocos Region
Constituencies established in 1907
Constituencies disestablished in 1917